Hazel Hall (February 7, 1886 – May 11, 1924) was an American poet based in Portland, Oregon.

Life
Hall was born on February 7, 1886, in Saint Paul, Minnesota, to Montgomery and Mary Hall. As a young girl, she moved with her family, including sisters Ruth and Lulie, to Portland, where her father managed the express division of the Northern Pacific Railway. After surviving scarlet fever at the age of 12, or by some accounts after being injured in a fall, she used a wheelchair for the rest of her life.

Leaving public school in fifth grade because of her paralysis, Hall continued her education by reading widely at home. Favorite authors included Emily Dickinson, Robert Frost, and Edna St. Vincent Millay. She began writing at about age 9, and continued writing as a hobby through her teen years. Seeking paid work that could be done at home, she turned to professional sewing, expanding on another of her childhood interests. Stitching bridal robes, baby dresses, and gowns for wealthy families, she worked near a window from which she could watch passers-by on the street. Her writing themes often involved sewing and what she saw from her window.

In her 20s, she began writing poetry. In 1916, when she was 30, her first published poem appeared in the Boston Evening Transcript, and in 1917 her poetry appeared in The Masses, a New York publication with a national circulation. Eventually she had poems accepted by The Century Magazine, Harper's Magazine, The New Republic, The Nation, Sunset, and many others.

Reviewer Pearl Andelson of Poetry said this of Hall's first collection, Curtains, in 1922, "Comes Hazel Hall with her little book, every word and emotion of which is poignantly authentic."

She died on May 11, 1924, at home in Portland, "after an illness of some weeks".

Legacy

Hall's home, located at 106 Northwest 22nd Place in Portland, is listed on the National Register of Historic Places as the Hazel Hall House.  In 1995, the Oregon Cultural Heritage Commission erected a small park next to the house.

The Oregon Book Award for poetry is jointly named for Hall and fellow Oregon poet William Stafford. The organization that sponsors the awards, Literary Arts, refers to Hall as the "Emily Dickinson of Oregon".

Awards
 1920, first prize for poems published by Contemporary Verse
 1921, Young Poets' Prize, Poetry magazine

Works

Books

Anthologies

References

Works cited

External links
 
 
 Hall book publication notice, Oregon State University Press
 Images of the Hazel Hall House from the University of Oregon Libraries Digital Archives

1886 births
1924 deaths
20th-century American poets
Poets from Oregon
American women poets
Writers from Saint Paul, Minnesota
Writers from Portland, Oregon
20th-century American women writers